Phillip Early (born 30 September 1959) is  a former Australian rules footballer who played with Essendon and Fitzroy in the Victorian Football League (VFL).

Notes

External links 		
		
Phillip Early's profile at Essendonfc.com		
		
		
		
		
Living people		
1959 births		
		
Australian rules footballers from Victoria (Australia)		
Essendon Football Club players		
Fitzroy Football Club players
Strathmore Football Club players